Psalm 1 is the first psalm of the Book of Psalms, beginning in the English King James Version: "Blessed is the man", and forming "an appropriate prologue" to the whole collection. The Book of Psalms is part of the third section of the Hebrew Bible, and a book of the Christian Old Testament. In Latin, this psalm is known as Beatus vir  or Beatus vir, qui non abiit.

The psalm is a regular part of Jewish, Catholic, Lutheran, Anglican, and other Protestant liturgies.

Text

Hebrew Bible version 

Following is the Hebrew text of Psalm 1:

King James Version
 Blessed is the man that walketh not in the counsel of the ungodly, nor standeth in the way of sinners, nor sitteth in the seat of the scornful. 
 And he shall be like a tree planted by the rivers of water, that bringeth forth his fruit in his season; his leaf also shall not wither; and whatsoever he doeth shall prosper. 
 The ungodly are not so: but are like the chaff which the wind driveth away. 
 Therefore, the ungodly shall not stand in the judgment, nor sinners in the congregation of the righteous. 
 For the  knoweth the way of the righteous: but the way of the ungodly shall perish.

Numbering 
The Book of Psalms is subdivided into five parts. Psalm 1 is found in the first part, which includes psalms 1 through 41. It has been counted as the beginning of part one in some translations, in some counted as a prologue, and in others Psalm 1 is combined with Psalm 2.

Background and themes 
Beatus vir, "Blessed is the man ..." in Latin, are the first words in the Vulgate Bible of both Psalm 1 and Psalm 112 (111). In illuminated manuscript psalters the start of the main psalms text was traditionally marked by a large Beatus initial for the "B" of "Beatus", and the two opening words are often much larger than the rest of the text. Between them these often take up a whole page. Beatus initials have been significant in the development of manuscript painting, as the location of several developments in the use of initials as the focus of painting.

Patrick D. Miller suggests that Psalm 1 "sets the agenda for the Psalter through its "identification of the way of the righteous and the way of the wicked as well as their respective fates" along with "its emphasis on the Torah, the joy of studying it and its positive benefits for those who do". Stephen Dempster suggests that the psalm serves also as an introduction to the Writings, the third section of the Tanakh.
This Book of the Law shall not depart from your mouth, but you shall meditate in it day and night, that you may observe to do according to all that is written in it. For then you will make your way prosperous, and then you will have good success.

Like many of the psalms, it contrasts the "righteous" person (tzadik צדיק) with the "wicked" or "ungodly" (rasha` רשע) or the "sinner" (chatta'  חטא). The righteous person is one who takes care to know the laws of God and so has good judgment and avoids bad company. The result is the ability to withstand difficult times in life supported by God's protection. On the other hand, the wicked person's behavior makes them vulnerable to disaster, like chaff blowing away in the wind. The point that the wicked and the righteous will not mingle at the judgment is clearly stated by the writer. The path the wicked have chosen leads to destruction, and at the judgment they receive the natural consequences of that choice.

The righteous man is compared in verse 3 to a tree planted by a stream. His harvest is plentiful, and whatever he does flourishes. He will be like a tree planted by the water that sends out its roots by the stream.” He elaborated: “It does not fear when heat comes; its leaves are always green.

Biblical scholar Alexander Kirkpatrick suggests that the "judgment" referred to in verse 5 pertains not only to the "last judgment", "as the Targum and many interpreters understand it", but also to every act of divine judgment.

Uses

Judaism 
Psalms 1, 2, 3, and 4 are recited on Yom Kippur night after Maariv.

Verse 1 is quoted in the Mishnah in Pirkei Avot (3:2), wherein Haninah ben Teradion explains that a group of people that does not exchange words of Torah is an example of the psalm's "company of scoffers".

Psalm 1 is recited to prevent a miscarriage.

In the Talmud (Berakhot 10a) it is stated that Psalm 1 and Psalm 2 were counted as one composition and David's favorite as he used the word "ashrei" ("blessed") in the opening phrase of Psalm 1 (ashrei ha′ish) and the closing phrase of Psalm 2 (ashrei kol choso vo).

Christianity 

In the Church of England's Book of Common Prayer, Psalm 1 is appointed to be read on the morning of the first day of the month.

English poet John Milton translated Psalm 1 into English verse in 1653. Scottish poet Robert Burns wrote a paraphrase of it, referring to "the man, in life wherever plac'd, ... who walks not in the wicked's way, nor learns their guilty lore!"

Some see the Law and the work of the Messiah set side by side in Psalms 1 and 2, 18 and 19, 118 and 119. They see the law and the Messiah opening the book of Psalms.

Book 1 of the Psalms begins and ends with 'the blessed man': the opening in Psalms 1–2 and the closing in Psalms 40–41. Theologian Hans Boersma notes that "beautifully structured, the first book concludes just as it started". Many see the 'blessed man being Jesus'.

Musical settings
Thomas Tallis included Psalm 1, with the title Man blest no dout, in his nine tunes for Archbishop Parker's Psalter (1567).

Heinrich Schütz wrote a setting of a paraphrase in German, "Wer nicht sitzt im Gottlosen Rat", SWV 079, for the Becker Psalter, published first in 1628.  Marc-Antoine Charpentier composed around 1670, one "Beatus vir qui non abiit", H.175, for 3 voices, 2 treble instruments and continuo.

Music artist Kim Hill recorded a contemporary setting of Psalm 1.

The Psalms Project released its musical composition of Psalm 1 on the first volume of its album series in 2012.

References

Cited sources

Further reading
 Berlin, Adele and Brettler, Marc Zvi, The Jewish Study Bible, Oxford University Press, Oxford, New York p. 1284-1285.
  (also known under the title of Homelies on Psalms)

External links

 
 
 Psalms Chapter 1 תְּהִלִּים text in Hebrew and English, mechon-mamre.org
 Text of Psalm 1 according to the 1928 Psalter
 Psalm 1 – The Way of the Righteous and the Way of the Ungodly text and detailed commentary, enduringword.com
 Blessed is the man who does not walk in the counsel of the wicked text and footnotes, usccb.org United States Conference of Catholic Bishops
 PSAL. I. / Bless'd is the man who hath not walk'd astray translation by John Milton, dartmouth.edu
 Psalm 1:1 introduction and text, biblestudytools.com
 Psalm 1 / Refrain: The Lord knows the way of the righteous. Church of England
 Psalm 1 at biblegateway.com
 Calvin's Commentaries, Vol. 10: Psalms, Part I, tr. by John King, (1847-50) / PSALM 1. sacred-texts.com
 Charles H. Spurgeon: Psalm 1 detailed commentary, archive.spurgeon.org
 Psalm 1 in Hebrew and English with commentary on specific Hebrew words.
 The happy man of Psalm 1, from the Jewish Bible Quarterly
 

001